Noodles are a staple of Japanese cuisine. They are often served chilled with dipping sauces, or in soups or hot dishes. Noodles were introduced to Japan from China during the Song Dynasty between the Heian until the early Kamakura period.

History
Noodles were first discovered in Japan around 800 A.D durning the Heian period (794-1185). This dish was adopted from China and was highly idolized in daily dieting due to the dishes flexibility and multiple different forms of serving options. Later on during the Kamakura period (1185-1333), noodles began to be viewed as a standard dish for most Samurai. This was because the dish met the dietary needs as it was not a greasy and its a relatively healthy food. 

During the Edo period, specifically between the 1661 to 1672, Soba noodles became popular in restaurants in the capital city of Edo (now Tokyo). It is rumored that it became extremely popular because soba noodles can be served cold, and with all of the fires occurring, the government limited the use of fuel.

Types of Japanese noodles
Ramen are thin, wheat-based noodles made from wheat flour, salt, water, and kansui, a form of alkaline water. The dough is risen before being rolled. They were imported from China during the Meiji period. How it made the jump from China to Japan is still under debate, but it's generally accepted that in 1910 a Chinese restaurant in Yokohama started serving a dish known as lamian.

Ramen noodles have a firm texture and are usually pale yellow in color. The noodles may vary in shape, width, and length. They are served in a broth. Examples of ramen dishes are shōyu ramen, shio ramen, miso ramen, tonkotsu ramen, and curry ramen.

Shirataki are clear noodles made from konnyaku. These noodles are chewy or rubbery. Shirataki are used to add texture to dishes such as sukiyaki and oden.

Soba is a noodle made from buckwheat and wheat flour. Soba noodles are available dried or fresh. They may be served  with hot broth or cold with dipping sauce (tsuyu). Examples of soba dishes are zaru soba (chilled), kake soba, tempura soba, kitsune soba, and tororo soba. Although the popular Japanese dish Yakisoba includes "soba" in its name, the dish is made with Chinese-style noodles (chūkamen).

Sōmen noodles are a very thin, white, wheat-based noodle. They are usually served chilled in the summertime with dipping sauces although they may be used in soups and other hot dishes. Sōmen noodles are very similar to hiyamugi and udon noodles, only they are thinner (about 1.3mm in width). Sōmen requires oil in its manufacture. During the summer months Japanese consume chilled sōmen to stay cool.

Hiyamugi are wheat flour noodles similar to sōmen and udon noodles and somewhere in between the two in size. These noodles are often served in the same manner as sōmen and udon noodles. While they are mostly white, there are bundles mixed with noodles of pinkish or brown hues.

Udon are the thickest of the noodles served in Japanese cuisine. Udon are white, wheat-based noodles, that are 4-6mm in width. These noodles are served chilled with a dipping sauce in the summer months, or in hot dishes and soups when the temperature is cooler. Udon dishes include kitsune udon, Nabeyaki udon, curry udon, and yaki udon. However, sara udon is made using a different kind of noodle which is crispy.

There are three nationally recognized regions in Japan known for their Udon noodles: Kagawa (Sanuki udon), Gunma (Mizusawa udon), and Akita (Inaniwa udon). These three regions contributed unique recipes of Udon, as well as different historical and cultural backgrounds of udon production and consumption. In the Kagawa region, it is considered the "kingdom of Sanuki udon" noodle, and has been deemed a symbol of regional identity to revitalize the regional food industry and to promote regional tourism. In the Gunma region, due to the high amount of noodle shops serving udon in the surrounding cities (Mizusawa, Kiryu, and Tatebayashi), Gunma was deemed the best place where visitors can experience the best locally produced udon noodle in Japan.

Harusame are glass noodles made from potato starch. These type of noodles are commonly used in hotpot dishes and salads, and used to create Japanese adaptations of Korean and Chinese noodle dishes. Harusame dishes include harusame salad, which is a cold noodle salad that features three main ingredients of julienned cucumbers, ham, and carrots. Other ingredients can include wakame seaweed, shredded egg omelet, tomatoes, bean sprouts, and more.

Tokoroten are jelly-like slices made of Kanten which comes from the gelatin of the tengusa a native seaweed. This dish was usually a summer time dish as it was composed of about 98% water. Tokoroten dates back to 1658 when an innkeeper discarded some Tokoroten which dried out into strips of Kanten which could be stored and preserved. The dish is typically garnished with soy sauce as well as rice vinegar.

See also
 Champon, a noodle soup of Japanese-Chinese origin
 Chinese noodles
 Instant noodles
 Korean noodles
 List of noodle dishes
 List of noodles
 Sapporo Ichiban
 Yakisoba, a popular noodle dish

References

 
Japanese inventions